Julie Cournoyer (born 1970 or 1971) is a Canadian visually impaired former para-cyclist who competed in the Paralympic Games and the IPC Cycling World Championships. She won two gold medals at the 1996 Summer Paralympics in Atlanta, United States and won a silver and bronze medal at each of the former multi-sport event and at the 2000 Summer Paralympics in Sydney, Australia, Cournoyer won a single silver and bronze medal each at the 1998 IPC Cycling World Championships in Colorado Springs, United States. She had Guylaine Larouche, Alexandre Cloutier and Christophe Cheseaux as guides throughout her career.

Early life and education
Cournoyer was born in approximately 1970 to 1971, and comes from Sherbrooke in Quebec. She is blind; her vision deteriorated when she was a child and her sight is estimated to be between one and two percent from which she can see only shadows. Cournoyer attended the Université de Sherbrooke and studied for a master's degree in social work. She did skiing from the age of eighteen upon learning the Montreal Association of the Blind organized ski days with guides.

Career 
She was able to compete at the 1996 Summer Paralympics in Atlanta, United States after a fundraising programme was held enough raise sponsorship funding. No quotas were reserved for blind athletes but Cournoyer qualified for the newly introduced tandem events since two athletes with cerebral palsy had used two of their five spots reserved to them. She and her guide Guylaine Larouche trained on a non-competition hybrid bicycle used during the 1976 Summer Olympics in Montreal and loaned a bike for the Paralympics from the Veterans Cycling Federation president. With her guide and former national Canadian team cyclist Larouche, Cournoyer won the bronze medal at the women's  time trial tandem open event by finishing third on August 17.

On the following day, she and Larouche placed second to earn the silver medal at the women's  track individual pursuit tandem open for the visually impaired. Two days after that, Cournoyer and Larouche finished first in the women's  tandem open road race after completing 7 laps for the gold medal. Her final race at the Atlanta Paralympics was the mixed  tandem open road race with male guide Alexandre Cloutier on August 22. The two came in the first place to claim the gold medal.

Following the Paralympics, she attended a ceremony to celebrate the achievements of Quebec athletes competing in Atlanta and received a gift painting from Lucien Bouchard, the Premier of Quebec. Cournoyer received further recognition of her achievements during a reception held at Sherbrooke City Hall on September 16. She and Larouche went on to win the silver medal and finished the highest-placed female pairing in the  velo-tandem race held as part of the Défi sportif in Montreal in early May 1997. The pair subsequently won the Critérium de Catalogne and came second at an international competition in Montjuïc, Spain.  At the 1998 Défi sportif, she and Cloutier performed a final-minute sprint to claim the silver medal for the mixed  tandem cycling road event.

Cournoyer and Cloutier finished first amongst Canadians and ninth overall in an international mixed category event held in Belgium at the end of May 1998. She attained qualification to the 1998 IPC Cycling World Championships in Colorado Springs, United States by finishing second at the time trial and  road race events in Belleville, Ontario. Cournoyer teamed up with Cloutier to win the silver medal in the  time trial and bronze in the  event. In July 1999, she and Cloutier finished three seconds adrift for second place in the Canadian Tandem Cycling Championship in Vancouver that was composed of a time trial and road event. The following year, Cournoyer finished second in each of the Handisport BT1 and Tandem races of the Canadian National Road Race Championships in Peterborough, Ontario.

She was later paired with guide Pascal Choquette when Cloutier was competing in the United States and won the bronze medal at the time trial event of the Quebec Cycling Championships. Cournoyer competed in four events at the 2000 Summer Paralympics in Sydney, Australia. She and Cloutier won Canada's first medal of the 2000 Paralympics when she claimed the silver by finishing second in the mixed tandem open individual pursuit race. The duo went on to place sixth in the mixed track  time trial tandem open and seventh in the mixed track sprint tandem open. Cournoyer and Cloutiter came third for the bronze medal in the mixed tandem open road race and this was the sixth and final Paralympic medal she claimed in her career.

In 2001, she told Cloutier his services were no longer needed and replaced him with Swiss guide Christophe Cheseaux. The duo ventured to Switzerland to compete in the European Cycling Championships and won the bronze medal in the  time trial tandem open event. The following year, Cournoyer won the mixed tandem and mixed tandem kilo events in the Canadian National Road Race Championships in Bromont, Quebec. After finishing fourth in the mixed  time trial and sixth in the  pursuit event of the 2002 UCI Para-cycling Track World Championships in Germany, she ended her career in August 2002 by telling Cheseaux of her decision.

Personal life 
She is married to Sylvain Lambert and gave birth to a child in 2005. Cournoyer received recognition for her sporting achievements from the Association sportive des aveugles du Québec in 2014.

References

Living people
Sportspeople from Sherbrooke
20th-century Canadian women
21st-century Canadian women
Canadian female cyclists
Cyclists from Quebec
Université de Sherbrooke alumni
Cyclists at the 1996 Summer Paralympics
Cyclists at the 2000 Summer Paralympics
Medalists at the 1996 Summer Paralympics
Medalists at the 2000 Summer Paralympics
Paralympic medalists in cycling
Paralympic gold medalists for Canada
Paralympic silver medalists for Canada
Paralympic bronze medalists for Canada
Year of birth missing (living people)